Alexandra Bennett (married name Alexandra Kelham; born 1977) is a female English former competitive swimmer.

Swimming career
Bennett represented England in seven events at the 1994 Commonwealth Games in Victoria, British Columbia, Canada, which included three medals; a gold medal in the 4 × 100 m freestyle relay with Claire Huddart, Karen Pickering and Sue Rolph, and two silver medals in the 4 × 200 m freestyle relay and 4 × 100 m medley relay.

She missed out on the chance to compete at the 1996 Olympic Games after a serious car accident, in which she broke both of her legs.

Personal life
She is a lawyer by trade.

References

Female butterfly swimmers
English female freestyle swimmers
Commonwealth Games medallists in swimming
Commonwealth Games gold medallists for England
Commonwealth Games silver medallists for England
Swimmers at the 1994 Commonwealth Games
1977 births
Living people
20th-century English women
21st-century English women
Medallists at the 1994 Commonwealth Games